Tim Pütz and Jan-Lennard Struff were the defending champions but chose not to defend their title.

Kevin Krawietz and Andreas Mies won the title after defeating Martin Kližan and Filip Polášek 6–2, 3–6, [10–2] in the final.

Seeds

Draw

References
 Main Draw

AON Open Challenger - Doubles
2018 Doubles
AON